Almond, also known as Flat Rock, is an unincorporated community in Randolph County, Alabama, United States.

History
The community was most likely named for its first postmaster, Almond P. Hunter. A post office called Almond was established in 1852, and remained in operation until it was discontinued in 1913.

Demographics

Flat Rock/Almond Precinct (1870-1950)

Almond has never reported separately as an unincorporated community on the U.S. Census. However, the 8th beat/precinct of Randolph County, was named "Flat Rock" (the earlier name for Almond) from 1870-1910 and as Almond from 1920-1950. In 1960, the precinct was merged as part of a larger reorganization of counties into the census division of Wadley.

References

Unincorporated communities in Randolph County, Alabama
Unincorporated communities in Alabama